The Chessie was a proposed streamlined passenger train developed by the Chesapeake and Ohio Railway (C&O) in the late 1940s. The brainchild of C&O executive Robert R. Young, the Chessie would have operated on a daylight schedule between Washington, D.C., and Cincinnati, Ohio. The train's luxury lightweight equipment was built new by the Budd Company. Although the equipment was delivered, a worsening financial outlook led to the cancellation of the train before it operated in revenue service.

Concept 
Robert Young became chairman of the C&O in 1942. Chairman Young proved himself an innovator and pushed for improved passenger service on the C&O. He intended the Chessie as a vehicle for his ideas, naming the train after Chessie, the small cat who served as the C&O's mascot and alter-ego. The Chessie would operate between Washington and Cincinnati in daylight, with connections to Newport News, Virginia, and Norfolk, Virginia, at Charlottesville, Virginia, and Louisville, Kentucky, at Ashland, Kentucky. Passengers would travel in unprecedented comfort: coaches would contain just 36 seats, while standard configurations at the time had between 44 and 60, and the extra space would carry lounge seating. A year before the Chicago, Burlington and Quincy Railroad (CB&Q) demonstrated the "Silver Dome" dome car, Young planned to have domes on the Chessie. A section of the twin-unit dining car on the train's rear would show first-run movies. All the cars would be newly built lightweight equipment.

Cancellation 
The C&O ordered the equipment in 1944, at the height of World War II and optimism about post-war traffic prospects.  By the time Budd completed the order in 1948, much had changed.  Passenger traffic, which had peaked at 6.7 million in 1944, fell to 3.9 million by 1947 and 3 million in 1948.  The C&O scaled back its expansion plans, canceling several outstanding equipment orders and selling off delivered cars.  The Chessie was a casualty of this new outlook.  In addition, the Baltimore and Ohio's competing service on the Cincinnati route, the Cincinnatian, was losing money and cost far less to operate than the upper-scale Chessie.  The C&O did operate a single test train of the Chessie, but by October 1948 the C&O had broken up the consists and was reallocating the Chessie'''s equipment to other trains, if not selling it outright.  Most of the cars went to the Pere Marquette Division to equip two new Pere Marquette streamliners between Chicago and Grand Rapids, Michigan. Almost all the equipment was sold to other railroads in 1951. Twelve coaches of the Chessie were exported to Argentina and replaced their standard gauge bogies for a broad gauge ones for use on General Roca Railway's premium service El Marplatense that operated from Buenos Aires to Mar del Plata.

 Equipment 

The C&O ordered 46 cars from the Budd Company, including baggage cars, coaches, dome cars, tavern-lounges, dining-observation cars, and dining room-theater cars. The C&O placed its orders with Budd in 1944 and the equipment arrived in August 1948. The cars cost $6.1 million.

 Power 

To pull the Chessie'' the C&O ordered three experimental steam turbine locomotives from the Baldwin Locomotive Works. As diesel locomotives became more prevalent following World War II, the C&O was one of several railroads loath to abandon coal as a fuel source, and saw steam turbine technology as a possible alternative to diesel. At the time of their construction these locomotives were the longest single-unit locomotives in the world. Not including research and development, the three locomotives cost $1.6 million. The M1s proved a failure in operation and were scrapped in 1950. To supplement the turbines the C&O had also rebuilt their 1926-built five F-19 pacifics into the new, streamlined L-1 hudson class in 1947. After the cancellation the L-1s were moved to other services and soon replaced by diesels. One, 490, was spared from scrap and eventually donated to the Baltimore and Ohio Railroad Museum for static display where it remains today.

Roster

References 

Chesapeake and Ohio Railway
Named passenger trains of the United States
Budd Company